Aperture masking interferometry is a form of speckle interferometry, that allows diffraction limited imaging from ground-based telescopes, and is a high contrast imaging mode on the James Webb Space Telescope. This technique allows ground-based telescopes to reach the maximum possible resolution, allowing ground-based telescopes with large diameters to produce far greater resolution than does the Hubble Space Telescope. The principal limitation of the technique is that it is applicable only to relatively bright astronomical objects. A mask is placed over the telescope which only allows light through a small number of holes. This array of holes acts as a miniature astronomical interferometer. The method was developed by John E. Baldwin and collaborators in the Cavendish Astrophysics Group.

Description
In the aperture masking technique, the bispectral analysis (speckle masking) method is typically applied to image data taken through masked apertures, where most of the aperture is blocked off and light can only pass through a series of small holes (subapertures). The aperture mask removes atmospheric noise from these measurements through the use of closure quantities, allowing the bispectrum to be measured more quickly than for an un-masked aperture.

For simplicity the aperture masks are usually either placed in front of the secondary mirror (e.g. Tuthill et al.  (2000)) or placed in a re-imaged aperture plane as shown in Figure 1.a) (e.g. Haniff et al.  (1987); Young et al.  (2000); Baldwin et al.  (1986)). The masks are usually categorised either as non-redundant or partially redundant. Non-redundant masks consist of arrays of small holes where no two pairs of holes have the same separation vector (the same baseline – see aperture synthesis). 

Each pair of holes provides a set of fringes at a unique spatial frequency in the image plane. Partially redundant masks are usually designed to provide a compromise between minimizing the redundancy of spacings and maximizing both the throughput and the range of spatial frequencies investigated (Haniff & Buscher, 1992; Haniff et al., 1989). Figures 1.b)  and 1.c) show examples of aperture masks used in front of the secondary at the Keck telescope by Peter Tuthill and collaborators; Figure 1.b) is a non-redundant mask while Figure 1.c) is partially redundant. 

Although the signal-to-noise of speckle masking observations at high light level can be improved with aperture masks, the faintest limiting magnitude cannot be significantly improved for photon-noise limited detectors (see Buscher & Haniff (1993)).

See also

 List of astronomical interferometers at visible and infrared wavelengths

References 
 Peter Tuthill's PhD thesis on aperture masking (PostScript) (PDF)
 Baldwin et al. (1986)
 Buscher & Haniff (1993)
 Haniff et al. (1987)
 Haniff et al., 1989
 Buscher et al. 1990
 Haniff & Buscher, 1992
 Tuthill et al. (2000)
 Young et al. (2000)

Further reading 
 NIRISS Aperture Masking Interferometry

External links 
Old method brings life to new stars – ABC Science Online
Examples of high-resolution time-lapse movies produced with aperture masking
Peter Tuthill awarded Eureka award for aperture masking work

Astronomical interferometers
Astronomical imaging
Speckle imaging